Tripoli, Beautiful Land of Love (Italian: Tripoli, bel suol d'amore) is a 1954 Italian comedy war film directed by Ferruccio Cerio and starring Alberto Sordi, Lyla Rocco and Fulvia Franco. It takes its title from a traditional song of the same name which features prominently on the soundtrack. The plot draws some inspiration from that of The Three Musketeers. It was shot in Ferraniacolor, and took around 248 million lire at the Italian box office.

It is set against the backdrop of the Libyan War between Italy and the Ottoman Empire in 1911. A young man from the countryside volunteers to join the  Bersaglieri, but quickly clashes with three overbearing comrades. They resent the newcomer because Maria the daughter of the marshal, who they are all in love with, has shown attention to the young man. However all eventually become close friends. When war breaks out they travel to Tripoli to fight, accompanied by Maria who has enlisted in the Red Cross.

Cast

References

Bibliography 
 Chiti, Roberto & Poppi, Roberto. Dizionario del cinema italiano: Dal 1945 al 1959. Gremese Editore, 1991.

External links 
 

1954 films
1950s war comedy films
Italian war comedy films
1950s Italian-language films
Films directed by Ferruccio Cerio
Films set in Libya
Films set in the 1910s
Italian historical comedy films
1950s historical comedy films
1950s Italian films